"I Believe I'm Fine" is a song by German DJs and record producers Robin Schulz and Hugel. The song was released on 8 September 2017 as the third single from his third studio album, Uncovered (2017). The song was written by Dennis Bierbrodt, Jürgen Dohr, Guido Kramer, Dave Gibson, Stefan Dabruck, Florent Hugel, Christopher Braide, Kara DioGuardi, Lindsay Lohan and Robin Schulz.

Music video
The official music video of the song was released on 8 September 2017 through Robin Schulz's YouTube account. The music video was directed by Annegret von Feiertag.

Track listing

Charts

Certifications

References

2017 singles
2017 songs
Robin Schulz songs
Songs written by Jürgen Dohr
Songs written by Dave Gibson (Scottish singer-songwriter)
Songs written by Kara DioGuardi
Songs written by Lindsay Lohan
Songs written by Chris Braide
Songs written by Robin Schulz